Funkiella is a genus of flowering plants from the orchid family, Orchidaceae native to Mexico and Central America.

Funkiella hyemalis (A.Rich. & Galeotti) Schltr - from central Mexico to Guatemala
Funkiella laxispica (Catling) Salazar & Soto Arenas - Oaxaca
Funkiella parasitica (A.Rich. & Galeotti) Salazar & Soto Arenas - from central Mexico to Costa Rica
Funkiella stolonifera (Ames & Correll) Garay - Chiapas, Guatemala
Funkiella tenella (L.O.Williams) Szlach. - Chihuahua, Durango
Funkiella valerioi (Ames & C.Schweinf.) Salazar & Soto Arenas - Costa Rica, Guatemala
Funkiella versiformis Szlach.  - Costa Rica

See also 
 List of Orchidaceae genera

References 

  (1920) Beihefte zum Botanischen Centralblatt. Zweite Abteilung 37(2, Heft 3): 430–431. 
  (2003) Genera Orchidacearum 3: 207 ff. Oxford University Press.
  2005. Handbuch der Orchideen-Namen. Dictionary of Orchid Names. Dizionario dei nomi delle orchidee. Ulmer, Stuttgart

External links 

Cranichideae genera
Spiranthinae